Liu Zhenwu (born August 1945) is a retired general (shangjiang) of the Chinese People's Liberation Army (PLA). He was the first Commander of the PLA Hong Kong Garrison, and later served as Deputy Commander and Commander of the Guangzhou Military Region, and Deputy Chief of the PLA General Staff Department.

Biography
Liu Zhenwu was born in August 1945 in Nan County, Hunan Province. He enlisted in the People's Liberation Army (PLA) in July 1961, serving in the 370th Regiment of the 124th Division of the 42nd Group Army. He joined the Communist Party of China (CPC) in June 1964.

Starting as an ordinary soldier, Liu rose through the ranks of the 42nd Army, becoming chief of staff in August 1983. In 1987 he studied military science at the PLA National Defence University. He became deputy commander of the 42nd Army in December 1989, and commander in July 1992. He was promoted to the rank of major general in July 1990.

In 1994, when the PLA Hong Kong Garrison was being formed in preparation for the transfer of sovereignty over Hong Kong, Liu was named its first commander. In this capacity, he toured Hong Kong's military bases and facilities in July 1996, accompanied by Major General Bryan Dutton, the outgoing commander of the British Forces Overseas Hong Kong. Soon after Hong Kong's handover from Britain to China on 1 July 1997, Liu was promoted to lieutenant general at the end of the month, outranking his British predecessors. He commanded about 15,000 soldiers in the garrison, most of whom were based across the border in mainland China. In September 1997, he became an alternate member of the 15th Central Committee of the Communist Party of China.

In March 1999, Liu became Deputy Commander of the Guangzhou Military Region, which oversaw the Hong Kong Garrison. He was promoted to Commander of the Guangzhou MR in January 2002, and became a full member of the 16th Central Committee in November. He was awarded the rank of full general (shangjiang) in June 2004.

In June 2007, Liu was transferred to Beijing to serve as Deputy Chief of the PLA General Staff Department, a position he held until July 2009. He retired from his military career, and was appointed in February 2010 as deputy director of the Foreign Affairs Committee of the 11th National People's Congress.

References

1945 births
Living people
People's Liberation Army generals from Hunan
Commanders of the People's Liberation Army Hong Kong garrison
Commanders of the Guangzhou Military Region
People from Nan County